Robert Dowling may refer to:

Robert Hawker Dowling (1827–1886), Australian artist
Robert Wagner Dowling (1924–2019), Alberta MLA 1971–1979
Robert W. Dowling (1895–1973), benefactor to Dowling College
Sir Robert Dowling (teacher), Birmingham educator
Robert E. Dowling, founding director of National Reserve Bank of the City of New York in 1909